William Henry Fitzjohn (5 November 1915 – 20 December 1989) was a Sierra Leonean churchman, educator and diplomat.

Life
Fitzjohn was ordained into the ministry of the Evangelical United Brethren Church (Dayton, Ohio) in 1946. From 1950 to 1959 he taught educational sociology and religion at Fourah Bay College, University of Durham, and was associate minister at King memorial, Evangelical United Brethren church. From 1951 to 1959 he was also Member of the Sierra Leone House of Parliament.

From 1959 to 1961 he was Chargé d'affaires in Washington DC. Early in the spring of 1961, a snub turned into an international incident, when he stopped for dinner with his driver at a Howard Johnson's restaurant on the outskirts of Hagerstown, Maryland en route to Pittsburgh for a lecture. Both men were refused service because of their color. President John F. Kennedy, appalled by what had transpired, received Fitzjohn in the White House. The president of Howard Johnson's apologized for the snub while the mayor of Hagerstown, Winslow F. Burhans, invited him to a dinner with several of the city's leading citizens.

From 1961 to 1965 he and his wife served as Principal and Vice-Principal of Harford Secondary School for Girls in Sierra Leone. From 1961 to 1964 he was High Commissioner in London (United Kingdom). In 1962 he became Director of Sierra Leone Selection Trust Ltd. From November 1971 to 1976 he was High Commissioner in Lagos.

References

1915 births
1990 deaths
Ambassadors of Sierra Leone to the United States
High Commissioners of Sierra Leone to the United Kingdom
High Commissioners of Sierra Leone to Nigeria
People from Bonthe District